Leon Williams (born 6 November 1983) is a British former professional boxer who competed from 2009 to 2012. He held the British Cruiserweight title from 2011 to 2012.

Williams won the Southern Area title in October 2010 with a points win over JJ Ojuederie. This was followed, however, by a second-round knockout by Richard Turba.

Williams became British cruiserweight champion following his controversial defeat of Robert Norton on 21 October 2011. Most observers had Norton comfortably winning the fight. Williams lost the British title in January 2012 when he was stopped in the final round by Shane McPhilbin. This time, Williams was well ahead on the cards and had dropped McPhilbin earlier in the fight, but a late barrage by McPhilbin saw the fight stopped.

Williams fought Tony Conquest in July 2012 in an attempt to regain his Southern Area title. Conquest stopped Williams in the first round.

External links

1983 births
Living people
English male boxers
Cruiserweight boxers
Prizefighter contestants